Reginald Eurias Cathey (August 18, 1958 – February 9, 2018) was an American character actor. He was best known for his roles as Norman Wilson in The Wire, Martin Querns in Oz, the game show announcer in Square One Television, Dr. Franklin Storm in the 2015 reboot of Fantastic Four, and Freddy Hayes in House of Cards, the last earning him three consecutive Emmy Award nominations for Outstanding Guest Actor in a Drama Series, including a win in 2015.

Early life
Cathey was born on August 18, 1958 in Huntsville, Alabama, to Red Cathey, an Army colonel who fought in World War II, the Korean War and the Vietnam War, and his wife, who was a DOD worker and an educator. He had a sister, Donza. He spent his childhood with his family on a rural farm in West Germany before returning to Alabama at the age of 14. His interest in theater began at age 9, after attending a United Service Organization show in West Germany. Cathey graduated from J.O. Johnson High School, where he acted in plays such as To Kill a Mockingbird. He subsequently studied theatre at the University of Michigan and the Yale School of Drama.

Career
One of Cathey's earliest roles was starring in the children's television show Square One TV. Cathey was not only the game show announcer, but had many bit parts in the various sketches and was renown for songs like "Nine, Nine, Nine"  and "Rappin' Judge." This was followed by guest roles in such series as Star Trek: The Next Generation and Homicide: Life on the Street. In 1994, he appeared in The Mask as Freeze, the main antagonist's friend and bodyguard who gets inadvertently killed by the title character. He also appeared in 1995's Se7en as the coroner. He played the villain Dirty Dee in the cult comedy film Pootie Tang and had a regular role on the HBO series The Wire as Norman Wilson during the fourth and fifth seasons. He also worked with The Wire creator David Simon on the Emmy Award-winning miniseries The Corner; Cathey played a drug addict known as Scalio. He had a recurring role on the HBO prison drama Oz as unit manager Martin Querns. In the film Tank Girl, he played the role of Deetee. He narrated Aftermath: Population Zero, a National Geographic Channel special which imagines what Earth might be like if humanity no longer existed. He played the homeless man Al, murdered by Patrick Bateman, in the film American Psycho. He narrated TLC's Wonders of Weather, a TV series. On Between the Lions, he played King Ray in the story of "Rumpelstiltskin" in the episode, "Hay Day".

In 2009, Cathey performed in The People Speak, a documentary feature film that uses dramatic and musical performances of the letters, diaries, and speeches of everyday Americans, based on historian Howard Zinn's A People's History of the United States.

In Fall 2009, Cathey played the role of Ellis Boyd "Red" Redding in a theatrical production of The Shawshank Redemption at Wyndham's Theatre, London. He has made two guest appearances on Law & Order: Special Victims Unit, as an undercover police officer involved with animal smuggling (episode: "Wildlife") and later as a high-priced defense attorney to a hooker (episode: "Rhodium Nights").  He also made a guest appearance on Law & Order: Criminal Intent in the episode "Anti-Thesis" as a college professor suspected of murder. He also played boxing promoter Barry K. Word on the FX series Lights Out.

In 2013, Cathey began a recurring role as Freddy Hayes, the owner of Freddy's BBQ, in Netflix's original series House of Cards, as well as on Grimm, in the recurring role of Baron Samedi. His portrayal of Hayes in the second, third, and fourth seasons of House of Cards earned three Emmy nominations and one win for Outstanding Guest Actor in a Drama Series.

Cathey had expressed a wish to appear in the Irish soap opera Fair City.

Cathey co-starred in Josh Trank's Fantastic Four (2015), as Dr. Franklin Storm, the father of The Invisible Woman and The Human Torch. He also played the county sheriff in the city of Rome, WV, in the Cinemax series Outcast. One of Cathey's final TV roles was portraying James Lucas in the Netflix series Marvel's Luke Cage.

Death
Cathey died at his home in New York City on February 9, 2018, at the age of 59. He was reported to have had lung cancer. He was cremated, and his ashes were spread in New York City.

Filmography

Film

Television

References

External links

1958 births
2018 deaths
20th-century American male actors
21st-century American male actors
Actors from Huntsville, Alabama
American expatriates in Germany
American male film actors
American male stage actors
American male television actors
Deaths from lung cancer in New York (state)
Male actors from Alabama
Primetime Emmy Award winners
University of Michigan School of Music, Theatre & Dance alumni